Perry Bard (born in Quebec City, Canada) lives and works in New York City. She is an interdisciplinary artist who works with film, site-specific public art installation projects around the world, and on the Internet.

Many of her projects are collaborations with the public and selected communities. In 2011, her ongoing work Man with a Movie Camera: The Global Remake was chosen for inclusion in Google's selected top creative uses of the Internet. In 2010 the project was named one of the Top 25 Videos for the Guggenheim Museum's YouTube Play Biennial of Creative Video. For the public participation project, Bard invited interpretations of Dziga Vertov's classic 1929 film Man with a Movie Camera, through uploads to a web site where software designed for the project archives sequences and streams a new film daily on the site. "The viewer sees two concurrent sets of images on a single screen: Vertov's original film and the remake of it that has been constructed on the Internet."  The film has been shown at the Moscow International Film Festival, the Toronto International Film Festival, and the International Documentary Film Festival Amsterdam, at the Transmediale Berlin and won awards at Ars Electronica, Liedts-Meesen, and Transitio_MX. The remade film "exists on the Web, at media festivals, and in the gallery and museum but also travels and is launched on outdoor public commons screens." Evelin Stermitz quotes Bard in an interview in Rhizome: "The primary idea was to use global input via the Internet to generate multiple versions of one film to be screened in public space and on the web."

Career

Bard created Status: Stolen, a public work focused on artifacts missing from Iraq's Baghdad Museum in 2005. A mobile truckside billboard depicting the missing artifacts traversed New York City for thirty days in June 2005. "Bard's itinerant billboard served as an aide-memoire, reminding us that military victory and cultural conquest go hand in hand." A number of magazine advertisements featuring the artifacts followed in issues of Art Journal in 2006.

Bard also writes often for Afterimage: The Journal of Media Arts and Cultural Criticism, and has curated a number of exhibitions in the United States and abroad.

Bard earned a B.A. at McGill University, and an M.F.A. degree at the San Francisco Art Institute. She pursued doctoral studies at the University of Wisconsin where she completed all but a dissertation in French Theatre studies. She moved to New York City in 1983.  Bard has taught graduate and undergraduate art for many years in New York at the School of Visual Arts and the Pratt institute.

Early work

The Times, an installation  at Petrosino Park, New York City. Steel and mirror "roof," and the first paragraph of Charles Dickens' Tale of Two Cities painted backwards on the sidewalk referencing homelessness. Commissioned by the Lower Manhattan Cultural Council, 1992.
Back Seat Foot Arm Lead, an installation at P.S. 1. Twelve desk arms mounted on steel poles with typical desk chair cast in lead; slide projection of students' feet crossing and uncrossing at the foot of the chair, 1991.
Shelters and Other Spaces, an installation at the SculptureCenter in New York. Concrete blocks, rocks, slide projector with 81 pictures of temporary shelters on the streets of New York City projected onto glass "pillow" and cardboard shelter bought from Scott, who was living on the street.

Collaborative work

The Terminal Salon, a site-specific public video projection at the Staten Island Ferry Terminal, in collaboration with residents of a housing project on Staten Island, commissioned by Sailors' Snug Harbor and produced in collaboration with the New York City Housing Authority and the Department of Transportation, 2000.
Walk This Way, a rear-screen video projection in a public square in Middlesbrough, UK, in collaboration with at-risk teens invited by the University of Teesside, 2001.
Boomerang: No Delay, a Skype collaboration with Alejandro Jaramillio Hoyos, Bogota, on remake of Nancy Holt's and Richard Serra's video Boomerang, 2011.

Recent projects

Hotel. A performance and a video installation commissioned for the First International Biennial of Art Cartagena, Colombia. Gestures of waiters choreographed and performed in collaboration with dancers from El Colegio del Cuerpo for the city whose largest employer is the hotel industry, 2014.
Out My Window Down the Alley Around the Corner and Up the Block. Houses, hotels and technoculture mix in this video where inside, outside, public and private dissolve into one gentrifying landscape. Single channel video screened in Documentary Fortnight at the Museum of Modern Art, New York (2015); two channel installation with 3D objects exhibited at Joyce Yahouda Gallery, Montreal, 2014.
Traffic, a documentary short film about the knock-off trade on Canal Street, New York City, as part of Documentary Fortnight, Vipe International Media Festival, Basel, 2005.
The Meaning of Bialy, a video installation commissioned by Hybrid Dwellings, Arsenal Gallery, Białystok, Poland. Bialys are returned to Bialystok, their point of origin in this artwork which uses food to reveal cultural practices, prejudices and histories, 2001.

Awards

Google's 106 Best Uses of the Web, 2011
Guggenheim YouTube Play Biennial, Top 25, 2010
Liedts Meesen Technological Award, Honorary Mention, 2010
Transitio_MX, Honorable Mention, 2010
Video 2000, The Contemporary Museum, Baltimore, Maryland, 2000
Yaddo Fellow, 1988

Grants

Canada Council for the Arts, 2008, 1994, 1991, 1990, 1989, 1986, 1985, 1981
New York Foundation for the Arts, Individual Artist Grant, 2009
Puffin Foundation Grant, 2005
Pollock-Krasner Foundation Grant, 1990
National Endowment for the Arts, 1983

Selected curated exhibitions

OWS New York Video Vortex 8, Museum of Contemporary Art, Zagreb, Croatia, 2012
Life on the Screen,  Joyce Yahouda Gallery, Montreal, Canada, 2011
Multitude Singular, co-curated with Berta Sichel, Reina Sofia Museum, Madrid, Spain, 2009
Fierce Logic (En Perfecto Desorden), Reina Sofia Museum, Madrid, Spain, 2007
Post-Yugoslavia Video Program, Art in General, New York, 2005

Further reading

Beaudet, Pascal. "Parallels & Boundaries," Vanguard,  (May, 1984), p. 45
Tourangeau, Jean. "Powerhouse Dix Ans Apres", Vie des Arts, (Dec.-Fev., 1985) p. 85
Smith, Roberta. "Social Spaces," New York Times, (Feb. 12, 1988) p. C23
Canogar, Daniel. "The Architecture of the Homeless", Lapiz (No.75, 1991) p. 61-69
Phillips, Patricia. "Perry Bard", Artforum (April, 1990), New York, p. 173-74
Raven, Arlene. "Perry Bard: The Times," Village Voice (Dec. 17, 1992) p. 119
Cotter, Holland."Sculpture Not Meant to Last," New York Times (August 18,'95) C22 
Sichel, Berta. "Perry Bard", Flash Art, New York  (Jan.-Feb. 1999) p. 96
Wasilewski, Marek. "Hybrid Dwellings", Springerin, (Feb. 2001) p. 66-67
Jarque, Vicente. "Terra Infirma", El Pais, Madrid (July 18, 2005) p 18
Sholette, Greg. "Breaking and Entering", Art Journal (Summer 2006) p. 7
Phillips, Patricia. "Art That Insists – Persistence With Urgency," Art Journal (Summer 2006) p5
Struppek, Mirjam."The Social Potential of Urban Screens" Visual Culture, (2006) p180-81

Notes

External links
 Artist's website

Canadian emigrants to the United States
Living people
Interdisciplinary artists
Year of birth missing (living people)